The 1958 The Citadel Bulldogs football team represented The Citadel, The Military College of South Carolina in the 1958 NCAA University Division football season.  Eddie Teague served as head coach for the second season.  The Bulldogs played as members of the Southern Conference and played home games at Johnson Hagood Stadium.

Schedule

References

Citadel Bulldogs
The Citadel Bulldogs football seasons
Citadel football